is a literary form in traditional Japanese literature – an extended prose narrative tale comparable to the epic novel. Monogatari is closely tied to aspects of the oral tradition, and almost always relates a fictional or fictionalized story, even when retelling a historical event. Many of the great works of Japanese fiction, such as the Genji Monogatari and the Heike Monogatari, are in the monogatari form.

History 
The form was prominent around the 9th to 15th centuries, reaching a peak between the 10th and 11th centuries. Monogatari was the court literature during the Heian era and also persisted in the form of archaic fiction until the sixteenth century. According to the Fūyō Wakashū (1271), at least 198 monogatari existed by the 13th century and that only 24 exist today.

Genres
The genre is sub-divided into multiple categories depending on their contents:

Denki-monogatari
Stories dealing with fantastical events.

Uta-monogatari

Stories drawn from poetry.

Tsukuri-monogatari
Aristocratic court romances.

Rekishi-monogatari

Historical tales that emerged during the late Heian period, flourishing until the medieval age. These narratives were commonly written in kanbun (hybrid form of Chinese) or wabun (Japanese). Two of the most notable  of this monogatari included the Eiga Monogatari and Ōkagami, which both narrated the story of Michinaga, the renowned Fujiwara regent.

Gunki-monogatari

Military chronicles and stories about war.

Setsuwa-monogatari
Anecdotal tales.

Giko-monogatari
Pseudo-classical imitations of earlier tales.

Influence
When European and other foreign literature later became known to Japan, the word monogatari began to be used in Japanese titles of foreign works of a similar nature. For example, A Tale of Two Cities is known as Nito Monogatari, One Thousand and One Nights as Sen'ichiya Monogatari and more recently The Lord of the Rings as Yubiwa Monogatari and To Kill a Mockingbird as Arabama Monogatari.

See also
 Mumyōzōshi, a 13th-century literary critique on monogatari, many of which are no longer extant
 Fūyō Wakashū, a 13th-century collection of poetry from various monogatari sources, many of which are no longer extant
 Konjaku Monogatarishū, a collection of over one thousand Heian period monogatari, of which 28 remain today.

References

 Frederic, Louis (2002). "Monogatari." Japan Encyclopedia. Cambridge, Massachusetts: Harvard University Press.
 
 

 
Buddhist literature
Japanese chronicles
Japanese culture